There have been two baronetcies created for persons with the surname Lucas-Tooth, both in the Baronetage of the United Kingdom.

History
The Lucas-Tooth Baronetcy, of Queen's Gate in the Royal borough of Kensington, and of Kameruka in the county of Auckland (New South Wales), was created in the Baronetage of the United Kingdom on 26 July 1906 for the brewer Robert Lucas-Tooth. Born Robert Tooth, he had assumed by Royal licence the additional surname of Lucas (which was that of his maternal grandfather) in 1904. He was succeeded by his youngest son, the second Baronet. Like his two elder brothers, he died in the First World War in 1918, leaving two daughters. As none of the brothers left male issue the baronetcy consequently became extinct.

The Lucas-Tooth Baronetcy, of Bught in the County of Inverness, was created in the Baronetage of the United Kingdom on 1 December 1920 for the seventeen-year-old Hugh Lucas-Tooth. He was the son of Major Hugh Warrand and his wife Beatrice Maude, eldest daughter of the first Baronet of the 1906 creation. The baronetcy was created with remainder, failing male issue of the body of the grantee, to the other heirs male of the body of his mother. Born Hugh Warrand, he assumed by Royal licence the surname of Lucas-Tooth in lieu of his patronymic in 1920. Lucas-Tooth later became a successful Conservative politician. In 1965 he assumed for himself only the additional surname of Munro.

Lucas-Tooth baronets, of Queen's Gate and Kameruka (1906)
Sir Robert Lucas Lucas-Tooth, 1st Baronet (1844–1915)
Sir Archibald Leonard Lucas Lucas-Tooth, 2nd Baronet (1884–1918)

Lucas-Tooth baronets, of Bught (1920)
Sir Hugh Vere Huntly Duff Munro-Lucas-Tooth, 1st Baronet (1903–1985)
Sir (Hugh) John Lucas-Tooth, 2nd Baronet (born 1932)

References

Kidd, Charles, Williamson, David (editors). Debrett's Peerage and Baronetage (1990 edition). New York: St Martin's Press, 1990.

Baronetcies in the Baronetage of the United Kingdom
Extinct baronetcies in the Baronetage of the United Kingdom
Baronetcies created with special remainders